General Thaddeus E. "Thunderbolt" Ross (also known as the Red Hulk) is a fictional character who appears in comic books published by Marvel Comics featuring the Hulk. Ross is a United States military officer, the father of Betty Ross, ex-father-in-law of Glenn Talbot, father-in-law of Bruce Banner, and the head of the gamma bomb project that turned Banner into the Hulk. After the creation of the Hulk, Ross pursues the creature with a growing obsession, and, after learning that Banner and the Hulk are one and the same, Ross hunts Banner as well. In 2008, Ross was transformed into the Red Hulk to better combat his nemesis.

The character has been merchandized in various products, such as toys and statues, and appeared in numerous media adaptations, including animated television series, video games, and live-action feature films. He was portrayed by Sam Elliott in the 2003 film Hulk, by William Hurt in the Marvel Cinematic Universe (MCU) films The Incredible Hulk (2008), Captain America: Civil War (2016), Avengers: Infinity War (2018), Avengers: Endgame (2019), and Black Widow (2021), and by Harrison Ford in the MCU films Captain America: New World Order (2024) and Thunderbolts (2024), taking over the role after Hurt's death.

Publication history
Thunderbolt Ross first appeared in The Incredible Hulk #1 (May 1962) and was created by Stan Lee and Jack Kirby as a nemesis for the Hulk. He was a recurring character throughout this series. His character origin was revealed in The Incredible Hulk #291. The Red Hulk first appeared in Hulk vol. 3 #1 (January 2008), created by Jeph Loeb and Ed McGuiness, but his identity as Ross was not revealed until later. The origin of Red Hulk was revealed in Hulk #23.

Red Hulk began appearing as a regular character in Avengers vol. 4, from issue #7 (January 2011) through its final issue #34 (January 2013). His popularity resulted in him being used as a main character in the 2012 Thunderbolts series by Daniel Way and Steve Dillon. He also appeared in the issues #1–3 of the 2011 series The Avenging Spider-Man (November 2008) by Zeb Wells and Joe Madureira as a team-up character for Spider-Man.

Fictional character biography
Ross grew up in a military environment with both his father and paternal grandfather in the military.

Ross is the Air Force general in charge of Bruce Banner's gamma bomb project. His daughter, Betty, takes a liking to the young scientist, deepening Ross' dislike for the "weakling". After Banner's transformation into the Hulk, Ross spends years chasing the monster, becoming obsessed enough to commit treason by allying himself with supervillains such as the Leader, MODOK and the Abomination to destroy the Hulk. Dismissed from the military, he shows up at Betty and Bruce's wedding with a gun and shoots Rick Jones. He is recruited by S.H.I.E.L.D. agent Clay Quartermain to merge with the electric creature Zzzax, a process that gives Ross superpowers but also makes him mentally unstable. He is later restored to human form, but retains some residual energy-generating powers.

Finally, the Nevermind, a mutant who drains people of their life energy, attacks Gamma Base in search of a strong host, in this case the Hulk. After witnessing Banner and Rick Jones (who was the Hulk at that time) heroically engaging the mutant, Ross realizes that he has been wrong about the Hulk being a mindless monster. He saves his daughter by allowing the mutant to latch on him and discharging the energy resources he retained from Zzzax. Giving his blessing to Bruce and Betty, he dies in his daughter's arms.

Ross' body is later stolen by the Leader, who uses the powers of one of his followers to resurrect Ross. He turns him into a mindless replacement for his fallen soldier Redeemer. Ross is eventually recovered and revived by agents of the alien Troyjan and returns to the Air Force. He later comes up with a more cost-effective method of confronting the Hulk when he is in his childlike stage: active non-resistance. He and his men simply do not fire on or engage the Hulk in any way. The Hulk, confused, does not smash and leaps away.

Ross would become friends with Banner, but when Betty is seemingly killed due to what both Ross and Banner believed to have been Banner's gamma-irradiated DNA interacting with hers, he once more pursues the Hulk with a vendetta.

Around this time, General Ryker takes over the pursuit of the Hulk. Ross is indirectly involved, observing when Ryker mentally tortures Banner to try to figure out how the Hulk works. The Hulk escapes from Ryker's control and, after several adventures, is lost in space.

After the Hulk returns from exile and initiates "World War Hulk", General Ross, now a full general, makes his own return, electing to bring the fight to his nemesis once more after the Hulk beats Iron Man. After a failed assault on the Hulk, Ross and his men are captured and placed in chains under the watch of the Hulk's Warbound, the army he has brought back from space. The Hulk is eventually defeated via satellite weapons that revert him back to his human form.

Military branch
Ross' military affiliation has been inconsistently portrayed in the comics. Many early Hulk stories depicted Ross as an Army general trying to capture or destroy the Hulk with a U.S. Army battalion called the "Hulkbusters". However, he is also frequently seen in an Air Force uniform, as in his first appearance in Incredible Hulk #1. Stories about his service during World War II portray him as an Army officer in the U.S. Army Air Corps, as the Air Force was not a separate branch of the Armed Forces until September 18, 1947. In a November 2010 Q&A column, then-Marvel editor-in-chief Joe Quesada clarified that Ross is a member of the U.S. Air Force and that inconsistencies in his uniform can be explained via the artistic license with which artists attempt to present a more dramatic-looking uniform, and that Ross may be a part of a special unit of the U.S. Air Force, or the Marvel Universe's version of it, which has its own unique dress code.

The Army continuity is also followed in various Hulk adaptations, such as in the 1966 and 1996–1998 cartoon versions of the Hulk, the 2003 Ang Lee movie Hulk in which he is portrayed by Sam Elliott, and in the 2008 movie The Incredible Hulk, in which he is portrayed by William Hurt. The Official Handbook of the Marvel Universe: Hulk 2004 issue officially indicates Ross to be a three-star lieutenant general in the U.S. Air Force.

Red Hulk

The Red Hulk (also known as the Rulk or the IncREDible Hulk) was introduced in 2008 in Hulk (vol. 2) #1. The Red Hulk was created to be an uninhibited, tactically intelligent adversary to the Hulk. Although Kenneth Johnson, the creator of the 1970s TV series The Incredible Hulk, had suggested a red Hulk for that adaptation decades earlier, Marvel editor-in-chief Joe Quesada proposed the idea for the comics to debut a red version of the character whose human identity was a secret. Initially, the Red Hulk's identity was unknown both to the characters in the story and to the reading audience.

The opening story arc of the Hulk (vol. 2) series that premiered in 2008 established that the Red Hulk is very aggressive, as he murders the Hulk adversaries the Wendigo and the Abomination; destroys the Helicarrier of the spy organization S.H.I.E.L.D.; defeats several Marvel heroes; and, after causing an earthquake in San Francisco, is finally defeated by the combined efforts of the Hulk and Thor. In a subsequent storyline, the Collector places the character with other villains on a team called the Offenders, an evil version of the Defenders, in a bid to prevent the original Hulk from reuniting with Jarella. In that story, the Red Hulk siphons the Power Cosmic from the Silver Surfer, seemingly killing him, steals his board along with Terrax the Tamer's cosmic ax, and uses the power to go on a killing spree, killing Namor the Sub-Mariner, Tiger Shark, Dr. Strange, Baron Mordo, the Grandmaster, Terrax, a time-displaced Hulk, and the Psycho-Man. However, when the Red Hulk reveals this to Galactus, Galactus swiftly takes back the Power Cosmic from him. Subsequently, almost everyone he killed is brought back to life with no memory of the event.

The Red Hulk was created as part of a Super Soldier program by several persons, including Doc Samson and the criminal think tank the Intelligencia, headed by MODOK. The 2009 "Code Red" story arc also made allusions to the Red Hulk's real identity, and introduced a Red She-Hulk character, when Domino identifies the Red Hulk before his transformation.

In the 2010 story line "Fall of the Hulks: Gamma", the Red Hulk is related in flashback to have killed General Ross at the behest of Bruce Banner, with whom he has formed an alliance. However, the 2010 "World War Hulks" story line reveals that the Red Hulk is Thunderbolt Ross himself, the Red She-Hulk his daughter Betty, and the Ross who was "killed" was a Life Model Decoy used to convince the world that he had died. The Red Hulk then thwarts the Intelligencia's plan to take over the United States with a Life Model Decoy of Glenn Talbot by destroying the Talbot LMD and attempts to take over the country himself. He is thwarted by a restored Hulk, who beats the Red Hulk mostly due to the Red Hulk's exhaustion from overheating. The Hulk tells the Red Hulk that it was his idea to fake Ross' death and that he can never again resume that identity. After imprisoning the Red Hulk in Gamma Base, Banner makes arrangements with Steve Rogers for the Red Hulk to join the Avengers.

After Steve Rogers recruits the Red Hulk, the Red Hulk manages to stop the Intelligencia's failsafe plan "Scorched Earth". Although Banner had claimed that he removed the Red Hulk's energy-draining ability from him because it was killing the Red Hulk, the Red Hulk is shown to still possess this ability. After the events of the Scorched Earth program, the Red Hulk is paired up with a Life Model Decoy named Annie. The Red Hulk is occasionally assaulted by Ross' former protégé General Reginald Fortean, a scientist given superhuman mutations by MODOK named Zero/One, and the Indian serial killer Black Fog .

The Red Hulk plays a vital role in the Infinity Gem crisis of the "Heroic Age" story line. During the 2011 "Fear Itself" story line, the Red Hulk attempts unsuccessfully to stop the Thing (in the form of Angrir, Breaker of Souls) from destroying the Avengers Tower, as MODOK Superior and Black Fog converge on both combatants during the fight. Angrir dispatches the Red Hulk by knocking him out of the city and into Vermont.

As part of the 2012 Marvel NOW! relaunch, the Red Hulk leads a non-government sponsored version of the Thunderbolts. This incarnation is a strike team that cleans up the messes left by Ross' military career, but the team later decides on a new arrangement in which the team will do one mission for Ross, then a mission for a random member.

After the Hulk takes away the powers of Rick Jones, Skaar and Betty Ross, Ross starts monitoring the Hulk's movements. This leads to a battle in which Doc Green subdues the Red Hulk and injects him with a formula that reverts him back to Ross. The Army is alerted to the confrontation. When they arrive, the Army arrests Ross for deserting his country.

The 2016 "Civil War II" storyline reveals that Thunderbolt Ross is incarcerated in a classified military prison.

In 2018's Free Comic Book Day Captain America issue indicates that Ross is no longer incarcerated. Subsequently, in that year's Captain America #1, it is revealed that Ross was paroled for helping a resistance cell during the "Secret Empire" story line and appointed head of the investigation into the attack. However, he was later killed and Captain America was framed for his murder.

Powers and abilities
Marvel editor Mark Paniccia described the Red Hulk as "absolutely uninhibited, tactically intelligent", while writer Jeph Loeb said "The Red Hulk is the kind of Hulk we haven't seen before—a thinking, calculating, brutal weapon-toting kind of Hulk." To further distance the character away from the original: "Everything the Green Hulk isn't, the Red Hulk is. Except, of course, for his powers which are identical. And he looks the same, except he's red. And he's the same size. But other than that, they're complete opposites." The character has abilities almost identical to those of the Hulk. The character can also emit heat at will from his eyes during non-enraged periods and can augment power levels by absorbing various types of energy, such as gamma radiation (in one instance causing the Hulk to revert to alter ego Bruce Banner) and the Power Cosmic. When infected with Cable's techno-organic virus during the "X-Sanction" storyline, he was able to control this heat to burn the virus out of his system. Red Hulk was created through a combination of gamma radiation and cosmic rays. The satellites used to revert the Hulk to human form at the end of World War Hulk were used to power the device used to turn Ross into the Red Hulk. Unlike the green Hulk, the Red Hulk does not revert to human form when rendered unconscious, and his blood is a fluorescent yellow instead of green, remaining that color even in human form. Unlike the green Hulk, who gets stronger as his rage increases, Red Hulk's body temperature rises with his anger. Though the heat is intense enough to melt desert sand into glass, it causes him to weaken when it becomes too intense, as his physiology lacks a cooling mechanism to deal with the excess heat. Red Hulk has also been shown to have a weakness to Negative Zone energy, which caused him burning pain and drained him when he attempted to absorb it.

Reception
In 2009, Thunderbolt Ross was ranked as IGN's 71st Greatest Comic Book Villain of All Time.

Red Hulk
Comics featuring the Red Hulk sold well but received mixed reviews. The first five issues of the 2008 Hulk title sold out, and second printings featured new covers. Issue #6 was the second-best-selling title of September 2008, and issue #10 was sixth in February 2009.

Augie De Blieck Jr. of CBR.com gave the first six issues a positive review, describing it as a "silly fun action romp" and a "popcorn comic". De Blieck liked Loeb's lack of subtlety when giving out clues, saying "this is a book where anytime someone is about reveal the solution to the big mystery, they get knocked out by a slap in the face from the Red Hulk or a machine gun to the gut." His one criticism was that, although he liked the artwork, he would have preferred Dale Keown as the artist.

In 2012 Red Hulk was listed as #41 on IGN's "Top 50 Avengers". IGN reviewer Jesse Schedeen was generally critical of the series, citing a lack of character development and the emphasis on continuous action sequences over the ongoing question of Red Hulk's identity. Schedeen also derided the treatment of other mainstream Marvel characters within the pages of Hulk, saying about issue #5 "The series has already treated She-Hulk and Iron Man like ragdolls who crumple under the awesome might of Red Hulk. Now it's Thor's turn". Claiming bad dialogue, poor pacing and maltreated characters, Schedeen stated that Ed McGuinness' artwork was the only saving grace for the title.

Other versions
 In the Marvel 1602 sequel 1602: New World, an Admiral Ross of the Royal Navy captains a vessel sent to Roanoke to quell the "Witchbreed", including the 1602 version of the Hulk.
 In the 1995–1996 crossover "Age of Apocalypse", General "Thunderbolt" Ross is a member of the Human High Council, a movement dedicated to protecting humans from the murderous rampages of Apocalypse.
 In Amalgam Comics, Ross appears as the head of Project Cadmus. He is depicted far more sympathetically, as he adopts Spider-Boy and gives him the name Pete Ross after feeling sorry for the clone. He plays a role similar to Uncle Ben, as he is called "Uncle Gen" by Pete. After he is killed by a mugger, Pete decides to become a hero.
In the alternate world of newuniversal, General Thad Ross is Chairman of the Joint Chiefs of Staff. He comes under criticism for his use of nuclear weapons on superhumans.
 In the Ultimate Universe, General Ross is an Army General and the head of S.H.I.E.L.D. He later retires from that role and becomes a government liaison to the think tank that runs the Fantastic Four, with General Glenn Talbot assisting him.
 In Chris Giarrusso's all-ages series Mini Marvels, Thunderbolt Ross' Red Hulk form is depicted as a friendlier character with limited intelligence, and a friend of the Mini Marvel Green Hulk and Blue Hulk. His human form is seen in the "Hulk Date" story letting Betty go on a date with the Hulk but sends a Hulkbuster robot after him to keep him from trying any "funny stuff".
 In the "Marvel Noir" universe, a man named Ross is mentioned by Edwin Jarvis as a person he knew in World War I.
 In the 1996–1997 "Heroes Reborn" storyline, Ross was present during World War II and was present as Captain America protested the use of the atomic bomb on Hiroshima when meeting with U.S. president Harry S. Truman. This prompted Ross to put Nick Fury in charge of the new S.H.I.E.L.D. agency to deal with Captain America. Decades later, Ross was made the Chief of Staff for the United States military. At the time of his first appearance, he was in the hospital recovering from a heart attack. He was visited by his daughter Liz Ross, who was then security chief at Stark International.
 In Marvel Mangaverse, General Ross commands an armed space station that unsuccessfully attempts to destroy Galactus but is instead destroyed by him.

In other media

Television
 Thunderbolt Ross appears in The Marvel Super Heroes, voiced by Paul Kligman.
 Thunderbolt Ross appears in the 1980s The Incredible Hulk series, voiced by Robert Ridgely.
 Thunderbolt Ross appears in the 1990s The Incredible Hulk series, voiced by John Vernon.
 Thunderbolt Ross makes a non-speaking cameo appearance in the Fantastic Four: World's Greatest Heroes episode "Hard Knocks".
 Thunderbolt Ross and his Red Hulk form appear in The Avengers: Earth's Mightiest Heroes, voiced by Keith Ferguson and Fred Tatasciore respectively.
 General Ross appears in Iron Man: Armored Adventures, voiced by Eric Bauza.
 Thunderbolt Ross / Red Hulk appears in Hulk and the Agents of S.M.A.S.H., voiced by Clancy Brown.
 Thunderbolt Ross / Red Hulk appears in the Ultimate Spider-Man four-part episode "Contest of Champions", voiced again by Clancy Brown.
 Additionally, a Marvel Noir-inspired incarnation of Thunderbolt Ross appears in the episode "Return to the Spider-Verse Pt. 3", also voiced by Brown.
 Thunderbolt Ross / Red Hulk appears in the Avengers Assemble four-part episode "Civil War", voiced again by Clancy Brown. This version is a member of the Mighty Avengers.

Film
General Ross appears in Hulk, portrayed by Sam Elliott. This version is a decorated four-star administrator of Desert Base, later known as Gamma Base, in the 1970s and was colleagues with David Banner. After the murder of Edith Banner, Ross would continue to supervise her and Bruce Banner as he worked alongside Betty Ross at the Berkeley Lab.

Marvel Cinematic Universe

Thaddeus Ross appears in media set in the Marvel Cinematic Universe (MCU), initially portrayed by William Hurt and subsequently by Harrison Ford after Hurt's death. Director Joe Russo revealed the character's transformation into the Red Hulk was considered during production of Captain America: Civil War, but it was decided that there was not enough room in the narrative to substantiate that development. Screenwriter Christopher Markus stated that for a brief moment Red Hulk's inclusion was considered again in Avengers: Endgame, and that it was possible Ross could evolve into that character one day. Hurt himself stated "I wouldn't mind feeling like I had that much power... I created Thaddeus' ego with the same size as the monster's. With the same degree of messed up-ness. I'd take a shot at it." Director James Gunn expressed interest in making a film featuring both Hulk and Red Hulk, but the project never entered development due to conflicts with Universal Pictures, who hold the film rights to Hulk and his supporting cast.
 In the live-action film The Incredible Hulk (2008), Ross hunts down Bruce Banner after an experiment in super-soldier genetics turns Banner into the Hulk. The former has Emil Blonsky injected with a flawed recreation of the Super-Soldier Serum to track down Banner, only for Blonsky to go rogue and become the Abomination. After Banner defeats Blonsky, Ross is visited by Tony Stark, who tells him a team is being put together.
 In the live-action Marvel One Shot The Consultant, it is revealed that Stark was sent by S.H.I.E.L.D. agents Jasper Sitwell and Phil Coulson as a patsy to sabotage negotiations to have Blonsky in the Avengers Initiative. Ross became so annoyed with Stark that the latter ordered him to be taken out of the bar in which they had met, to which Stark responded by purchasing the bar and scheduling it for demolition.
 As of the live-action film Captain America: Civil War (2016), Ross has become the U.S. Secretary of State. He presents Stark and the Avengers with the Sokovia Accords, which require all enhanced individuals to be supervised by the United Nations, earning Steve Rogers' contempt. Following the Avengers fracturing over the Accords, Ross imprisons Rogers' allies in the Raft. After Rogers break them out, Ross calls Stark, but Stark ignores him.
 In the live-action film Avengers: Infinity War (2018), Ross, via remote holographic meeting, orders James Rhodes to arrest Rogers and his allies, but Rhodes rebuffs him.
 In the live-action film Avengers: Endgame (2019), Ross attends Stark's funeral.
 In the live-action film Black Widow (2021), which takes place partially during and after the events of Civil War, Ross and his men chase Natasha Romanoff on two separate occasions, but fail to catch her both times.
 Alternate timeline versions of Ross appear in the Disney+ animated series What If...?, voiced by Michael Patrick McGill. In the episode "What If... the World Lost Its Mightiest Heroes?", a variant of Ross leads a squad of soldiers in hunting Banner, who is secretly murdered by Hank Pym. In the episode "What If... Killmonger Rescued Tony Stark?", another variant of Ross entrusts Erik "Killmonger" Stevens to lead an army of Vibranium-based combat robots in an assault on Wakanda. In the episode "What If... Ultron Won?", a third variant of Ross is killed when Ultron takes control of the global arsenal of nuclear weapons and unleashes a nuclear holocaust.
 Following Hurt's death, Ford will portray Ross in the 2024 films Captain America: New World Order and Thunderbolts.

Video games
 General Ross makes a minor appearance in the 2003 Hulk film tie-in game.
 General Ross appears in The Incredible Hulk: Ultimate Destruction, voiced by Dave Thomas.
 General Ross appears in the 2008 The Incredible Hulk film tie-in game, voiced by William Hurt. Additionally, the Red Hulk is a playable character in the GameStop exclusive Xbox 360 version.
 Red Hulk appears as an alternate costume for the Hulk in Marvel: Ultimate Alliance 2, Marvel Super Hero Squad, Marvel vs. Capcom 3: Fate of Two Worlds, Ultimate Marvel vs. Capcom 3, Marvel Super Hero Squad: The Infinity Gauntlet, and Marvel vs. Capcom: Infinite.
 Red Hulk appears as a playable character in Marvel Super Hero Squad Online, voiced by Tom Kenny.
 Red Hulk appears as an unlockable character in Marvel: Avengers Alliance.
 Thunderbolt Ross / Red Hulk appears as a playable character in Lego Marvel Super Heroes, with the former voiced by John DiMaggio and the latter again voiced by Fred Tatasciore.
 Red Hulk appears as a playable character in Marvel: Contest of Champions.
 Red Hulk appears as a playable character in Marvel: Future Fight.
 Thunderbolt Ross / Red Hulk appears as a playable character in Lego Marvel's Avengers.
 Red Hulk appears as a playable character in Marvel Puzzle Quest.
 Thunderbolt Ross / Red Hulk appears as a playable character in Lego Marvel Super Heroes 2.

Miscellaneous
Chief Randall Crawford (voiced by Tom Kenny) takes on the form of "Thunderbolt Ross / Red Hulk" in the Paradise PD episode "Welcome to Paradise".

Merchandise
Red Hulk has been merchandised in the form of action figures and miniature statues.

Collected editions

References

External links
 Red Hulk (Thunderbolt Ross) at Marvel.com
 George, Richard (November 27, 2007). "Jeph Loeb's Red Hulk Interview". IGN.
 Cenac, Z. Julian (January 29, 2009). "An Ultimatum of an Interview with Jeph Loeb". ComixFan.

Avengers (comics) characters
Characters created by Jack Kirby
Characters created by Jeph Loeb
Characters created by Stan Lee
Comics characters introduced in 1962
Comics characters introduced in 2008
Fictional characters with nuclear or radiation abilities
Fictional characters with slowed ageing
Fictional characters with superhuman durability or invulnerability
Fictional generals
Fictional military strategists
Fictional super soldiers
Fictional United States Air Force personnel
Fictional United States Secretaries of State
Marvel Comics mutates
Marvel Comics characters who can move at superhuman speeds
Marvel Comics characters with accelerated healing
Marvel Comics characters with superhuman strength
Marvel Comics film characters
Marvel Comics male supervillains
Marvel Comics male superheroes
Marvel Comics military personnel